Kaluza may refer to:
 Dariusz Kałuża (born 1967), Polish clergyman
 Józef Kałuża (1896–1944), Polish footballer
 Max Kaluza (1856–1921), German scholar
 Otylia Tabacka-Kałuża (1907–1981), Polish middle-distance runner
 Renata Kałuża (born 1981), Polish para-cyclist
 Theodor Kaluza (1885–1954), German mathematician and physicist

See also
 

Polish-language surnames